Acacia jonesii is a species of Acacia native to eastern Australia.

Description

Distribution
It has a limited distribution in coastal regions in central and southern New South Wales. It is restricted to the area between Bargo in the north out to Goulburn in the east and down to around Nowra in the south where it is still considered to be rare. It grows in clay soils often over or around sandstone as a part of dry sclerophyll woodland and forest communities.

See also
 List of Acacia species

References

jonesii
Fabales of Australia
Flora of New South Wales